Berlin is an unincorporated community in Linn County, Oregon, United States.

History 

Originally, the community was developed around a horse racing course operated by the Burrell family. The races became so popular that the family began charging visitors for meals and their home became known as Burrell’s Inn.  When a local post office was established in 1899, it was called Berlin (a single word version of Burrell Inn). The Berlin post office was closed in 1937.

Geography

Waterloo is to the west; Sweet Home is to the south.

Berlin has a creek, the Hamilton Creek.

Berlin is a located in Linn County at latitude 44.498 and longitude -122.748.

References

Unincorporated communities in Linn County, Oregon